Brilino is a rural locality (a village) in Ustyuzhenskoye Rural Settlement, Ustyuzhensky District, Vologda Oblast, Russia. The population was 401 as of 2002. There are 10 streets.

Geography 
Vysotino is the nearest rural locality.

References 

Rural localities in Ustyuzhensky District